El Cielo is an Argentinian rock band formed in 2000. El Cielo is considered to be one of the newest best prolific bands in Argentina, touring with huge bands like Mancha de Rolando and Jovenes Pordioseros, playing all along Buenos Aires in the most popular clubs and recording an Album named Punto Final, which hit the radios with the song "Petalos de Rosa". They are actually recording their second Full Album, which will be produced by Gustavo Rowek and Sergio Berdichevsky. As for 2009, they are recording their second Studio Full Album, which is a work of 12 totally new songs.

History
El Cielo was formed in the year 2000 and all of its original members are still in the band. They began playing in the Moreno, Buenos Aires, where they are from, in small Clubs And Live Houses. In the year 2005 they started the Pre-Production of their first Full Album named Punto Final. They released it in 2006 and had gotten a big acceptation in the Under Scene. A small tour promoting the album started. El Cielo then entered in a hiatus, and returned in 2008 with the addition of Tomás Ayala in Drums. The band never had an official Drummer before, but used to play with session musicians.
As for today, El Cielo is producing their second Full Studio Album and continues to play shows in many of the most popular Clubs of Argentina.

Nowadays the band is composing the songs of the next album, yet untitled. The recording will start in July 2010. The band still plays Shows in the most popular Clubs of Argentina.

Discography

Studio albums
 Punto Final (2006)

Band members

Current/Former members
Fernando Rinero - vocals (2000–present)
Gastón Suarez - guitars/vocals (2000–present)
Sebastian Romeo - guitar (2004–present)
Martín Parra - bass guitar (2000–present)
Tomás Ayala - drums (2008–present)

References

External links
 Official website

Argentine rock music groups
Argentine hard rock musical groups
Musical groups established in 2000